Michel Bon (born 5 July 1943) is a French businessman and politician. He is a graduate of the ESSEC Business School, of the Paris Institute of Political Studies, of the École nationale d'administration and of Stanford Business School.

In 1981, he was selected to be one of the first Young Leaders of the French-American Foundation.

He worked at the banks Crédit national and Crédit Agricole. He has been CEO then Chairman of the supermarket group Carrefour. From 1993 to 1995 he was head of the French unemployment agency. He was Chairman of France Télécom from 1995 to 2002.

He was formerly president of the Institut Pasteur. He is also an administrator at Lafarge and formerly of Air Liquide.

References

1943 births
Living people
Businesspeople from Grenoble
French chief executives
ESSEC Business School alumni
Sciences Po alumni
École nationale d'administration alumni
Stanford Graduate School of Business alumni
Inspection générale des finances (France)
Politicians from Grenoble
Carrefour people
Orange S.A.
Officiers of the Légion d'honneur
Young Leaders of the French-American Foundation